Chandra, also known as Soma, is the Hindu god of the Moon, and is associated with the night, plants and vegetation. He is one of the Navagraha (nine planets of Hinduism) and Dikpala (guardians of the directions).

Etymology and other names

The word "Chandra" literally means "bright, shining or glittering" and is used for the "Moon" in Sanskrit and other Indian languages. It is also the name of various other figures in Hindu mythology, including an asura and a Suryavamsha king. It is also a common Indian name and surname. Both male and female name variations exists in many South Asian languages that originate from Sanskrit.

Some of the synonyms of Chandra include Soma (distill), Indu (bright drop), Atrisuta (son of Atri), Shashin or Shachin (marked by hare), Taradhipa (lord of stars) and Nishakara (the night maker), Nakshatrapati (lord of the Nakshatra), Oshadhipati (lord of herbs), Uduraj or Udupati (water lord), Kumudanatha (lord of lotuses) and Udupa (boat).

Soma
Soma is one of the most common other names used for the deity; but the earliest use of the word to refer to the Moon is a subject of scholarly debate. Some scholars state that the word Soma is occasionally used for the Moon in the Vedas, while other scholars suggest that such usage emerged only in the post-Vedic literature. 

In the Vedas, the word Soma is primarily used for an intoxicating and energizing/healing plant drink and the deity representating it. In post-Vedic Hindu mythology, Soma is used for Chandra, who is associated with the moon and the plant. The Hindu texts state that the Moon is lit and nourished by the Sun, and that it is Moon where the divine nectar of immortality resides. In Puranas, Soma is sometimes also used to refer to Vishnu, Shiva (as Somanatha), Yama and Kubera. In some Indian texts, Soma is the name of an apsara; alternatively it is the name of any medicinal concoction, or rice-water gruel, or heaven and sky, as well as the name of certain places of pilgrimage.

Literature

The origin of Soma is traced back to the Hindu Vedic texts, where he is the personification of a drink made from a plant with the same name. Scholars state that the plant had an important role in Vedic civilization and thus, the deity was one of the most important gods of the pantheon. In these Vedic texts, Soma is praised as the lord of plants and forests; the king of rivers and earth; and the father of the gods. The entire Mandala 9 of the Rigveda is dedicated to Soma, both the plant and the deity. The identification of Soma as a lunar deity in the Vedic texts is a controversial topic among scholars. According to William J. Wilkins, "In later years the name Soma was [.....] given to the moon. How and why this change took place is not known; but in the later of the Vedic hymns there is some evidence of the transition.

In post Vedic texts like the Ramayana, the Mahabharata and the Puranas, Soma is mentioned as a lunar deity and has many epithets including Chandra. According to most of these texts, Chandra, along with his brothers Dattatreya and Durvasa, were the sons of the sage Atri and his wife Anasuya. The Devi Bhagavata Purana states Chandra to be the avatar of the creator god Brahma. Some texts contain varying accounts regarding Chandra's birth. According to one text, he is the son of Dharma; while another mention Prabhakar as his father. Many legends about Chandra are told in the scriptures.

In one version of the puranas, Chandra and Tara—the star goddess and the wife of devas' guru Brihaspati—fell in love with each another. He abducted her and made her his queen. Brihaspati, after multiple failed peace missions and threats, declared war against Chandra. The Devas sided with their teacher, while Shukra, an enemy of Brihaspati and the teacher of Asuras, aided Chandra. After the intervention of Brahma stopped the war, Tara, pregnant, was returned to her husband. She later gave birth to a son named Budha, but there was a controversy over the paternity of the child; with both Chandra and Brihaspati claiming themselves as his father. Brahma once again interfered and questioned Tara, who eventually confirmed Chandra as the father of Budha. Budha's son was Pururavas who established the Chandravamsha Dynasty.

Chandra married 27 daughters of Prajapati Daksha — Ashvini, Bharani, Krittika, Rohini, Mrigashiras, Ardra, Punarvasu, Pushya, Ashlesha, Magha, Pūrvaphalguni, Uttaraphalguni,
Hasta, Chitra, Svati, Vishakha, Anuradha, Jyeshtha,
Mula, Purvashadha, Uttarashadha, Shravana, Dhanishta,
Shatabhisha, Purvabhadrapada, Uttarabhadrapada,
Revati. They all represent one of the 27 Nakshatra or constellations near the moon. Among all of his 27 wives, Chandra loved Rohini the most and spent most of his time with her. The 26 other wives became upset and complained to Daksha who placed a curse on Chandra. 

According to another legend, Ganesha was returning home on his mount Krauncha (a shrew) late on a full moon night after a mighty feast given by Kubera. On the journey back, a snake crossed their path and frightened by it, his mount ran away dislodging Ganesha in the process. An overstuffed Ganesha fell to the ground on his stomach, vomiting out all the Modaks he had eaten. On observing this, Chandra laughed at Ganesha. Ganesha lost his temper and broke off one of his tusks and flung it straight at the Moon, hurting him, and cursed him so that he would never be whole again. Therefore, It is forbidden to behold Chandra on Ganesh Chaturthi. This legend accounts for the Moon's waxing and waning including a big crater on the Moon, a dark spot, visible even from Earth.

Iconography
Soma's iconography varies in Hindu texts. The most common is one where he is a white-coloured deity, holding a mace in his hand, riding a chariot with three wheels and three or more white horses (up to ten).

Soma as the Moon-deity is also found in Buddhism, and Jainism.

Zodiac and calendar
Soma is the root of the word Somavara or Monday in the Hindu calendar. The word "Monday" in the Greco-Roman and other Indo-European calendars is also dedicated to the Moon. Soma is part of the Navagraha in Hindu zodiac system. The role and importance of the Navagraha developed over time with various influences. Deifying the moon and its astrological significance occurred as early as the Vedic period and was recorded in the Vedas. The earliest work of astrology recorded in India is the Vedanga Jyotisha which began to be compiled in the 14th century BCE. The moon and various classical planets were referenced in the Atharvaveda around 1000 BCE.

The Navagraha was furthered by additional contributions from Western Asia, including Zoroastrian and Hellenistic influences. The Yavanajataka, or 'Science of the Yavanas', was written by the Indo-Greek named "Yavanesvara" ("Lord of the Greeks") under the rule of the Western Kshatrapa king Rudrakarman I. The Navagraha would further develop and culminate in the Shaka era with the Saka, or Scythian, people. Additionally the contributions by the Saka people would be the basis of the Indian national calendar, which is also called the Saka calendar.

The Hindu calendar is a Lunisolar calendar which records both lunar and solar cycles. Like the Navagraha, it was developed with the successive contributions of various works.

Astronomy

Soma was presumed to be a planet in Hindu astronomical texts. It is often discussed in various Sanskrit astronomical texts, such as the 5th century Aryabhatiya by Aryabhatta, the 6th century Romaka by Latadeva and Panca Siddhantika by Varahamihira, the 7th century Khandakhadyaka by Brahmagupta and the 8th century Sisyadhivrddida by Lalla. Other texts such as Surya Siddhanta dated to have been complete sometime between the 5th century and 10th century present their chapters on various planets with deity mythologies. However, they show that the Hindu scholars were aware of elliptical orbits, and the texts include sophisticated formulae to calculate its past and future positions:

The longitude of Moon = 
– Surya Siddhanta II.39.43
where m is the Moon's mean longitude, a is the longitude at apogee, P is epicycle of apsis, R=3438'.

Chandra temples 

Besides worship in Navagraha temples, Chandra is also worshipped in the following temples (please help expand this partial list)

 Parimala Ranganatha Perumal temple: Vishnu temple with shrine for Chandra
 Kailasanathar Temple, Thingalur: Navagraha temple assciated with Chandra; main deity being Shiva
 Chandramoulisvarar Temple, Arichandrapuram: Shiva temple with shrine for Chandra
 ThiruVaragunamangai Perumal Temple: Nava Tirupathi Vishnu temple associated with Chandra

In popular culture

Chandra plays an important role in one of the first novel-length mystery stories in English, The Moonstone (1868).
The Sanskrit word Chandrayāna (Moon Vehicle) is used to refer to India's lunar orbiters.

See also 

 Ardha chandrasana, half-moon pose in yoga
 Navagraha
 Soma
 Somalamma
 List of lunar deities
 List of Hindu deities

Notes

References

Bibliography

External links
 

Fertility gods
Hindu gods
Lunar gods
Navagraha
Soma (drink)